The Luftwaffe Field Divisions (German: Luftwaffen-Feld-Divisionen or LwFD) were German military formations during World War II.

History

The divisions were originally authorized in October 1942, following suggestions that the German Army could be bolstered by transferring personnel from other services. The head of the Luftwaffe, Hermann Göring, formulated an alternative plan to raise his own infantry formations under the command of Luftwaffe officers; this was at least partly due to political differences with the Heer. Göring took great pride in the degree of political commitment and indoctrination of Luftwaffe personnel (he went as far as to describe paratroopers of the Luftwaffe as "political soldiers") while the Army was considered (by Nazi standards) too "conservative" (linked to conservative or monarchical traditions and ideals harking back to the Imperial days of the Kaiser).

The plan was approved, and the divisions were raised from 200,000 to 250,000 Luftwaffe ground, support and other excess personnel. They were initially organized with two jäger (light infantry) regiments of three battalions each, along with an artillery battalion and other support units, but were substantially smaller than equivalent Heer divisions, and by Göring's personal order were intended to be restricted to defensive duties in quieter sectors. Most of the units spent much of their existence on the Eastern Front: Luftwaffe Field Divisions were present at actions such as the "Little Stalingrad of the North", the attempt to relieve Velikiye Luki; the attempted defence of Vitebsk during Operation Bagration, and the fighting in the Courland Pocket, though they also fought in other theatres.

The Luftwaffe Field Divisions initially remained under Luftwaffe command, but late in 1943 those that had not already been disbanded were handed over to the Heer and were reorganized as standard infantry divisions with three two-battalion rifle regiments (retaining their numbering, but with Luftwaffe attached to distinguish them from similarly numbered divisions already existing in the Heer) and Army officers.

Until taken over by the Heer (and in many cases for some time afterwards) these units were issued with standard Luftwaffe feldblau uniforms, and being so easily identifiable were said to often be singled out by opposite forces. Their reputation as combat troops was poor, despite the high standard of  Luftwaffe recruits, at least in part from being required to perform roles (ground warfare) for which they as airmen usually had little training. An exception to the poor combat performance of Luftwaffe ground troops were fallschirmjäger (paratrooper) units, whose performance was generally good, due to better training and higher entrance standards when compared to the Field Divisions (early fallschirmjäger troops were also transferred directly from the Heer to the Luftwaffe). Field Division airmen were frequently used for rear echelon duties to free up front line troops.

Divisions

 1st Luftwaffe Field Division
 2nd Luftwaffe Field Division - At the Battle of Nevel (1943), the Soviet assault force struck and demolished the 2nd Luftwaffe Field Division. Like all the Luftwaffe "divisions" the 2nd was in fact the size of a brigade, with only four infantry battalions and was especially weak in artillery with just eight 75 mm mountain guns and a battery of Stug IIIs. It had been badly damaged in its first action south of Belyi during Operation Mars nearly a year earlier.
 3rd Luftwaffe Field Division
 4th Luftwaffe Field Division - Destroyed defending Vitebsk during the Vitebsk–Orsha offensive in June, 1944.
 5th Luftwaffe Field Division
 6th Luftwaffe Field Division- Destroyed defending Vitebsk during the Vitebsk–Orsha offensive in June, 1944.
 7th Luftwaffe Field Division
 8th Luftwaffe Field Division
 9th Luftwaffe Field Division
 10th Luftwaffe Field Division
 11th Luftwaffe Field Division
 12th Luftwaffe Field Division
 13th Luftwaffe Field Division
 14th Luftwaffe Field Division
 15th Luftwaffe Field Division
 16th Luftwaffe Field Division
 Eventually transferred to the Heer as 16th Luftwaffe Infantry Division (later 16th Volksgrenadier Division)
 17th Luftwaffe Field Division
 18th Luftwaffe Field Division
 19th Luftwaffe Field Division (later 19th Luftwaffe Sturm Division)
 Eventually transferred to the Heer as 19th Grenadier Division (later 19th Volksgrenadier Division)
 20th Luftwaffe Field Division (later 20th Luftwaffe Sturm Division)
 21st Luftwaffe Field Division (previously the Meindl Division, an ad hoc collection of Luftwaffe resources)
 22nd Luftwaffe Field Division - never formed, its sub-units were assigned to other divisions.

Luftwaffe Field Corps
 I Luftwaffe Field Corps, planned winter 1942–1943 on the basis of the XIII. Fliegerkorps, but never really established.
 II Luftwaffe Field Corps, October 1942 - 1 November 1943 : 2nd, 3rd, 4th and 6th Luftwaffe Field Division (Alfred Schlemm)
 III Luftwaffe Field Corps, January 1943 - November 1943 : 9th and 10th Luftwaffe Field Division (Job Odebrecht) 
 IV Luftwaffe Field Corps, January 1943 - 19 November 1944 : 198th, 716th and 189th Infantry Division (Erich Petersen)

See also 
 1st Fallschirm-Panzer Division Hermann Göring
 Fallschirm-Panzergrenadier Division 2 Hermann Göring
 List of German divisions in World War II
 Wehrmacht

References

 Ruffner, Kevin. Luftwaffe Field Divisions, 1941–45, Osprey, 1997,

External links
 Luftwaffe Field Divisions 1941-45 By Kevin Conley Ruffner

 
Hermann Göring
1942 establishments in Germany
1945 disestablishments in Germany
Military units and formations established in 1942
Military units and formations disestablished in 1945
Field Division